Urubu River is a river in Amazonas state in north-western Brazil. It is a tributary of the Amazon River, and it branches to the north (or to the left if facing downstream) near the town of Itacoatiara. It is a blackwater river.

Course

The source of the Urubu is to the north of Presidente Figueiredo, where it is protected by the  Caverna do Maroaga Environmental Protection Area, established in 1990.
It flows in a southwest direction, parallel to the Uatumã River. 
In the municipality of Rio Preto da Eva the river forms the northeast boundary of the  Rio Urubu State Forest, created in 2003.
The river ultimately flows into Lake Urubu, which is connected by several channels to the Amazon River. The Urubu River discharges into the Amazon via the Preto da Eva River and the Uatumã River.

See also
List of rivers of Amazonas

References

Rivers of Amazonas (Brazilian state)
Tributaries of the Amazon River